Gelechia versutella is a moth of the family Gelechiidae. It was described by Zeller in 1873. It is found in North America, where it has been recorded from Montana and Wyoming to Texas and California.

The larvae feed on Populus species, including Populus fremontii and Populus tremuloides.

References

Moths described in 1873
Gelechia